Robert Bellarmine Carl Katter (born 22 May 1945) is an Australian politician who has been a member of the House of Representatives since 1993. He was previously active in Queensland state politics from 1974 to 1992. Katter was a member of the National Party until 2001, when he left to sit as an independent. He formed his own party, Katter's Australian Party, in 2011.

Katter was born in Cloncurry, Queensland. His father, Bob Katter Sr., was also a politician. Katter was elected to the Queensland Legislative Assembly at the 1974 state election, representing the seat of Flinders. He was elevated to cabinet in 1983, under Joh Bjelke-Petersen, and was a government minister until the National Party's defeat at the 1989 state election.

Katter left state politics in 1992, and the following year was elected to federal parliament standing in the Division of Kennedy (his father's old seat). He resigned from the National Party in the lead-up to the 2001 federal election, and has since been re-elected four more times as an independent and twice for his own party. Katter is known for his social conservatism. His son, Robbie Katter, is a state MP in Queensland, the third generation of the family to be a member of parliament.

Early life, education and career

Katter was born in Cloncurry, Queensland, the son of Robert Cummin Katter, the member for Kennedy from 1966 to 1990, and his wife, Mabel. His paternal grandparents went to Cloncurry in a stage coach around 1900. Katter's paternal grandfather was a Lebanese migrant, who owned clothing stores throughout north Queensland. His father, Bob Katter Sr., was an Australian politician who was in the House of Representatives from 1966 to 1990, representing the National Party (originally named the Country Party).

Growing up in Cloncurry, Katter's family owned a clothing shop and managed a local cinema. He was one of only six at his school who finished year 12.

Katter attended the University of Queensland, where he studied law, but later dropped out without graduating. While at university, Katter was President of the University of Queensland Law Society and St Leo's College. As a university student, Katter pelted the Beatles with rotten eggs during their 1964 tour of Australia, declaring in a later meeting with band that he undertook this as "an intellectual reaction against Beatlemania". He also served in the Citizens Military Forces.

Returning to Cloncurry, he worked in his family's businesses, and as a "labourer in the Mt Isa Mines".

State politics (1974–1992)
Katter's father was a member of the Australian Labor Party until 1957, when he left during the Labor split of that year. He later joined the Country Party, now the Liberal National Party. The younger Katter was a Country Party member of the Legislative Assembly of Queensland from 1974 to 1992, representing Flinders in north Queensland. He was Minister for Northern Development and Aboriginal and Islander Affairs from 1983 to 1987, Minister for Northern Development, Community Services and Ethnic Affairs from 1987 to 1989, Minister for Community Services and Ethnic Affairs in 1989, Minister for Mines and Energy in 1989, and Minister for Northern and Regional Development for a brief time in 1989 until the Nationals were defeated in that year's election.

While in the Queensland Parliament, Katter junior was a strong supporter of Premier Joh Bjelke-Petersen, though he remained in cabinet under Mike Ahern, ultimately resigning from Cabinet along with Russell Cooper. He was on the backbench. Then appointed again to Cabinet in the traditional number two position of Mines & Energy. This was under the Bjelke-Petersen's factions restoration to power.

Federal politics (1993–present)
Katter did not run for re-election to state Parliament in 1992. He ran as the National candidate in his father's former seat of Kennedy at the 1993 federal election, facing his father's successor, Labor's Rob Hulls. Despite name recognition, Katter trailed Hulls for most of the night. On the eighth count, a Liberal candidate's preferences flowed overwhelmingly to Katter, allowing him to defeat Hulls by 4,000 votes. He would not face another contest nearly that close for two decades.

In 1994, Katter advocated against federal privacy laws that bypassed Tasmania's anti-gay laws, claiming the government was "helping the spread of AIDS" and legitimizing "homosexual behavior". He also believed the laws jeopardized states' rights in Australia.

Katter was re-elected with a large swing in 1996, and was re-elected almost as easily in 1998. However, when he transferred to federal politics, he found himself increasingly out of sympathy with the federal Liberal and National parties on economic and social issues, with Katter being opposed to neoliberalism and social liberalism. In 2001, he resigned from the National Party and easily retained his seat as an independent at the general elections of 2001, 2004, 2007 and 2010, each time ending up with a percentage vote in the high sixties after preferences were distributed.

In the aftermath of the 2010 hung federal election, Katter offered a range of views on the way forward for government. Two other former National Party MPs, both independents from rural electorates, Tony Windsor, Rob Oakeshott decided to support a Labor Government. Katter presented his 20 points document and asked the major parties to respond before deciding which party he would support. As a result, he broke with Windsor and Oakeshott and supported the Liberal/National Coalition for Government. On 7 September 2010, Katter announced his support for a Liberal/National Party coalition minority government.

On 5 June 2011, Katter launched a new political party, Katter's Australian Party, which he said would "unashamedly represent agriculture". He made headlines after singing to his party's candidates during a meeting on 17 October 2011, saying it was his "election jingle".

In the 2013 election, however, Katter faced his first serious contest since his initial run for Kennedy in 1993. He had gone into the election holding the seat with a majority of 18 percent, making it the second-safest seat in Australia. However, reportedly due to anger at his decision to back Kevin Rudd (ALP) for Prime Minister following Julia Gillard's (Prime Minister) live cattle export ban (Rudd, within weeks, reopened the live export market), Katter still suffered a primary-vote swing of over 17 points. His name heavily associated with Rudd.  In the end, Katter was re-elected on Labor preferences, suffering a two-party swing of 16 points to the Liberal National party.

In the 2016 election, Katter retained his seat of Kennedy, with an increased swing of 8.93 points toward him.

On 15 August 2017 Katter announced that the Turnbull Government could not take his support for granted in the wake of the 2017 Australian parliamentary eligibility crisis, which ensued over concerns that several MPs held dual citizenship and thus may be constitutionally ineligible to be in Parliament. Katter added that if one of the affected MPs, Deputy Prime Minister Barnaby Joyce, lost his seat, the Coalition could not count on his support for confidence and supply.

In November 2018, Katter secured funds for three inland dam-irrigation schemes in North Queensland.

In the 2019 election, Katter was returned to his seat of Kennedy with a swing of 2.9 points towards him, in spite of an unfavourable redistribution of his electorate. In the 2022 election, he was re-elected again, and became the Father of the Australian House of Representatives following the retirement of Kevin Andrews.

Political views

Katter is known as an unabashed social conservative and agrarian socialist. His views on economic matters echo "Old Labor" policy as it was before the Australian Labor Party split of 1955 as he opposes privatisation and economic deregulation and strongly supports traditional Country Party statutory marketing. The sobriquet 'Mad Katter' was coined by his opponents to describe his nationalistic developmentalism. He has a very sporadic attendance record in parliament, and by the end of 2019 had only attended 42% of votes on the floor of parliament, the lowest of any member of parliament.

As of 2020, Katter described himself as belonging to the "hard left," citing his continuing membership of the Construction, Forestry, Maritime, Mining and Energy Union. In a 2022 interview with The Chaser, Katter claimed that he had never pledged allegiance to the Monarch of the United Kingdom when entering parliament.

Abortion
In 2006 Bob Katter voted against a bill which would increase the availability of abortion drugs.

Environment
Katter has opposed enacting climate change legislation to control emissions. He advocates for measures that reduce carbon footprints. Katter has championed the mandating of ethanol fuel content. He has additionally pioneered protests against imported bananas, and is an opponent of the concentration of the Australian supermarket industry amongst Coles and Woolworths.

Gun laws
An opponent of the tougher gun control laws introduced in the wake of the 1996 massacre in Port Arthur, Tasmania, Katter was accused in 2001 of signing a petition promoted by the Citizens Electoral Council (CEC), an organisation that claims the Port Arthur massacre was a conspiracy. He has stated that he always and still believes there was no conspiracy.

Immigration
In 2017, Katter called for a "Trump-like travel ban" in Australia after a New South Welshman was arrested on terrorism charges. That same year, Katter repeated a pledge used by the far-right organisation "Proud Boys", including that he was "a proud western chauvinist". When asked about the incident when it was publicised in 2019, Katter distanced himself from the group, saying "I don't know who this group is or anything about it".

In 2021, Katter was opposed to the Liberal government's plan to have voter identification laws saying they were racist.

Indigenous Australians
In 1989, while Community Services Minister in the Queensland state government, Katter opposed installing condom vending machines in Aboriginal and Torres Strait Islander communities to reduce the spread of AIDS, describing the plan instead as an attempt at eugenics, or "racist genocide". He is also an opponent of voter identification laws, denouncing the Coalition's proposed introduction of them in 2021 as a racist system that would disenfranchise Aboriginal communities.

LGBT rights
In November 1989, Katter claimed there were almost no homosexuals in North Queensland. He promised to walk backwards from Bourke across his electorate if they represented more than 0.001 percent of the population. Katter also said "mind you, if there are more, then I might take to walking backwards everywhere!" He does not support same-sex marriage. His response to the Australian Marriage Law Postal Survey result was the subject of international attention, as in response he declared that the issue of crocodiles killing people in North Queensland was more pressing than same-sex marriage, and therefore he declared that "I ain't spending any more time" on the latter issue. In December 2017, Katter was one of only four members of the House of Representatives to oppose the Marriage Amendment (Definition and Religious Freedoms) Bill 2017 legalising same-sex marriage in Australia.

Personal life
Katter occasionally identifies as being an Aboriginal Australian and has described himself as a blackfella in federal parliament, in interviews, during television appearances and at public events. Katter claims that in his youth he was accepted as a member of the Kalkadoon tribe in the Cloncurry area, otherwise known as the "Curry mob", and said he has long since felt a deep connection with Aboriginal people.

His son Robbie has been a member of the Queensland Legislative Assembly since 2012, representing Mount Isa from 2012 to 2017, and  Traeger since 2017. He represents much of the territory that his father represented in state parliament.

Bibliography
Bob Katter, An Incredible Race of People: A Passionate History of Australia (Millers Point, New South Wales: Murdoch Books Australia, 2012).

See also

Politics of Queensland

References

External links

 Maiden Speech – Australian House of Representatives (6 May 1993), aph.gov.au

|-

|-

|-

1945 births
Independent members of the Parliament of Australia
Katter's Australian Party members of the Parliament of Australia
Australian monarchists
National Party of Australia members of the Parliament of Australia
National Party of Australia members of the Parliament of Queensland
Members of the Australian House of Representatives
Members of the Australian House of Representatives for Kennedy
People from Cloncurry, Queensland
Members of the Queensland Legislative Assembly
Living people
Australian Roman Catholics
Australian nationalists
21st-century Australian politicians
20th-century Australian politicians
Australian people of Lebanese descent